Thomas Workman (1843–1900) was an Irish entomologist and arachnologist who travelled widely collecting butterflies and studying spiders. He is best known for his book Malaysian Spiders, published in 1896, in which he described several new species.

Biography

Thomas Workman was born at Ceara, Windsor Avenue, Belfast, Ireland on 14 August 1843 into a wealthy family involved in muslin, linen and commerce. He became a successful businessman, at first in the linen trade and then in shipbuilding.   He was the elder brother of Frank Workman, born in 1856, who founded the Belfast shipyard of Workman Clark in 1879.

Travel

In the years 1869 and 1870 Workman travelled in North America spending his time mainly in the West, much with native tribes. His trip journals and  accounts of  the natural history of the American plains and Native Americans are now in the Public Records Office in Belfast. His collection of  North American Indian artefacts is in the Ulster Museum.
Each year, when business and family permitted,  Workman spent  lengthy periods in foreign lands, collecting insects, especially butterflies and spiders. His ethnographic collections are in the Ulster Museum in Belfast.

His most significant trips were

 1881 - Brazil
 1883 - India, Burma, Singapore, China and the Philippines
 1888 - Singapore and Ceylon
 1890 - Singapore and Java
 1892 - Ceylon, Singapore and India

Societies

Workman was, as well as being actively involved in the civic administration of Belfast, the Honorary Librarian of the Belfast Natural History and Philosophical Society becoming  president in 1898. He  died  in St. Paul, Minnesota,  U.S.A in 1900, having caught a chill en route from Vancouver following a trip to the Rocky Mountains.

Achievements

Aside from his work on spiders, especially those of the Far East, Workman was a considerable lepidopterist collecting for Adalbert Seitz  and Lionel Walter Rothschild among others.
Some of his specimens are  figured and noted without attribution in Seitz' monumental Macrolepidoptera of the World. A systematic description of the hitherto known Macrolepidoptera, edited in collaboration with well-known specialists published in Stuttgart by Alfred Kermen.

Contacts

Octavius Pickard-Cambridge (1828–1917)  England
Theodore Savory  England
Tord Tamerlan Teodor Thorell (1830–1901)  Sweden
Adalbert Seitz  (1860–1938) Germany
Lionel Walter Rothschild ( (1868–1937)  England

Spiders named after Workman

Damarchus workmanii Thorell
Theridium workmanii Thorell
Phidippus workmanii Peckham & Peckham
Goleta workmanii Peckham & Peckham

Published work

1880 Irish Spiders in The Entomologist
1896 Malaysian Spiders Volume 1 Privately published in Belfast.

Collections

Campbell College, Belfast: Lepidoptera
Ulster Museum, Belfast: Lepidoptera
National Museum of Ireland, Dublin Irish spiders: Lepidoptera
Natural History Museum, London World spiders: Lepidoptera

Correspondence
Workman's correspondence, diaries etc. are in the Public records Office Belfast

References

Irish Naturalist 9:241
Belfast Natural History and Philosophical Society Centennial Volume 1821-1891 144pp., portrait.

1844 births
1900 deaths
Irish entomologists
British arachnologists
Scientists from Belfast
People educated at Campbell College
19th-century British zoologists
Irish lepidopterists
Irish anthropologists